John Granger Macfarlane II (born July 30, 1929) is an American hotelier and politician who served in the Virginia Senate from 1984 until he lost reelection in 1991.

References

External links 
 

1929 births
Living people
Democratic Party Virginia state senators
20th-century American politicians